Yuri Viktorovich Klyuchnikov (born September 17, 1983) is a Russian professional ice hockey goaltender who currently plays for HC Sibir Novosibirsk of the Kontinental Hockey League (KHL).

References

External links

1983 births
Living people
HC Sibir Novosibirsk players
Lokomotiv Yaroslavl players
Russian ice hockey goaltenders
Zauralie Kurgan players